Cathayia insularum is a species of snout moth in the genus Cathayia. It was described by Speidel and Schmitz in 1991, and is known from Spain, Malta and the Canary Islands.

The larvae have been recorded feeding on the inflorescence of Phoenix canariensis and Phoenix dactylifera

References

Moths described in 1991
Galleriini